The Westin Dhaka is a Westin Hotel located at Gulshan Avenue in Dhaka. Its address is Plot-01, Road-45, Gulshan-2, Dhaka-1212, Bangladesh. At , it is the tallest hotel in Bangladesh, and one of the tallest hotels in South Asia. It has 27 floors, and was completed in 2006. It has been designed by Architect Mohammad Foyez Ullah and Mustapha Khalid Palash.

See also
 List of tallest buildings in Bangladesh
 List of tallest buildings in Dhaka

References 

Hotels in Dhaka
Westin hotels
Skyscrapers in Bangladesh
Skyscraper hotels
Hotel buildings completed in 2006